Hadsund Airport was an aerodrome in Hadsund, Denmark.

References

Airports in Denmark
Hadsund